Volcán River is the river tributary to the Maipo River. Its course lies completely in the Andes of the Santiago Metropolitan Region. The river and its tributaries drain, among other areas, the Chilean slopes of San José Volcano and El Morado Natural Monument area.

See also
List of rivers of Chile

References

Rivers of Santiago Metropolitan Region
Principal Cordillera
Rivers of Chile